Membraniporopsis is a genus of bryozoans belonging to the family Sinoflustridae.

The species of this genus are found in Southern America.

Species
Species:

Membraniporopsis bifloris 
Membraniporopsis bispinosa 
Membraniporopsis serrilamelloides 
Membraniporopsis tubigera

References

Cheilostomatida